Indian cucumber may refer to:

Indian cucumber (Hindi: kankri or khira, Malayalam: vellari, Telugu: dosekaya or dosakai, Bengali: shosha, Assamese:tihu or tiyoh), large variety of cucumber (Cucumis sativus) popular in India as a vegetable
Indian Cucumber-root Medeola virginiana